Clement Woodnutt Miller (October 28, 1916 – October 7, 1962) was an American politician who served as a U.S. representative from California from 1959 to 1962. He was killed in a plane crash during his second term in office.

Early life and career
Clement Miller was born in Wilmington, Delaware, on October 28, 1916. He graduated from the Lawrenceville School, from Williams College, Williamstown, Massachusetts, in 1940, and briefly attended Cornell University School of Industrial and Labor Relations in 1946.

He enlisted in the United States Army in 1940, serving as a private in the 258th Field Artillery Regiment. He was discharged in 1945 as a captain. During his military career, he had service in the Netherlands and Germany.

He became a veterans service officer in Nevada in 1946 and an employment service official for the State of Nevada, in 1947. He then became a field examiner and hearing officer for the National Labor Relations Board for Northern California from 1948 to 1953. He became a landscape consultant in 1954.

Tenure in Congress
He ran for Congress in 1956 but was unsuccessful. He ran again in 1958 and was elected as a Democrat to the Eighty-sixth Congress. In 1960, he was re-elected to the Eighty-seventh Congress. Of note, Miller authored the legislation that established Point Reyes National Seashore.

He served in Congress from January 3, 1959, until his death in an airplane accident near Eureka, California, on October 7, 1962. He was interred in Point Reyes National Seashore, north of San Francisco, California.

Legacy
He was a grandson of Charles R. Miller and a nephew of Thomas W. Miller, and the grandfather of poet and rapper George Watsky.

Miller was elected posthumously to the Eighty-eighth Congress.

He was the author of the book Member of the House: Letters of a Congressman.

See also
 List of United States Congress members who died in office (1950–99)

References
 Rebels With a Cause: film describes Rep. Miller's establishment of the Point Reyes National Seashore
 The Clem Miller Environmental Education Center

1916 births
1962 deaths
People from Wilmington, Delaware
Military personnel from Delaware
Democratic Party members of the United States House of Representatives from California
Politicians elected posthumously
Lawrenceville School alumni
Cornell University alumni
Accidental deaths in California
United States Army officers
Victims of aviation accidents or incidents in 1962
Victims of aviation accidents or incidents in the United States
Writers from California
Writers from Wilmington, Delaware
20th-century American politicians
Williams College alumni